Udara camenae is a butterfly of the family Lycaenidae. It is found in South-east Asia.

Subspecies
U. c. camenae (Sumatra)
U. c. euphon (Fruhstorfer, 1910) (Sulawesi)
U. c. filipina (Murayama and Okamura, 1973) (Philippines: Luzon)
U. c. mansuela Eliot and Kawazoé, 1983 (Serang: Ceram)
U. c. pendleburyi (Corbet, 1937) (western Malaysia)
U. c. strophis (H.H.Druce, 1895) (Borneo)

References

Butterflies described in 1895
Udara
Butterflies of Borneo
Butterflies of Asia